John Ovia (born 16 July 1976) is a Papua New Guinean cricketer. A right-handed batsman and right-arm off spin bowler, he has played for the Papua New Guinea national cricket team since the 1997 ICC Trophy. His wife Hebou Morea has played for the Papua New Guinea women's team.

Career

born 16 July 1976 in Port Moresby, Papua New Guinea, Ovia first played for Papua New Guinea in the 1997 ICC Trophy. In his debut against Italy, he scored 94 runs and won the man of the match as Papua New Guinea won the match by 101 runs. He played in four more matches in the tournament, including the 13th place play-off against Singapore, which Papua New Guinea won. The following year, he played in the ACC Trophy against Singapore and Malaysia.

In 2001, he represented his country in the Pacifica Cup, taking 3/31 in the third place play-off against Tonga to secure the third place spot in the tournament. This was followed by his second ICC Trophy, the 2001 tournament in Canada. In 2002, he played in the second Pacifica Cup, top scoring in the final against Tonga to help Papua New Guinea win the tournament. The following year, he played in the cricket tournament at the 2003 South Pacific Games, top-scoring in the final against Fiji to pick up a gold medal. The following year, he represented a combined East Asia/Pacific team in the Australian national country championships, and has played in the tournament every year since.

In 2005, he played for Papua New Guinea at the repêchage tournament for the 2005 ICC Trophy. Papua New Guinea beat Fiji in the final, to qualify for the 2005 ICC Trophy in Ireland, where Ovia made his List A debut against the Netherlands.

In 2007, Ovia played for Papua New Guinea at Division Three of the World Cricket League in Darwin, Australia. He most recently played for them in the cricket tournament at the 2007 South Pacific Games, though he missed Papua New Guinea's record-breaking win over New Caledonia, picking up a second South Pacific Games gold medal.

References

1976 births
Living people
Papua New Guinean cricketers
Papua New Guinean sportsmen
People from the National Capital District (Papua New Guinea)
Papua New Guinean cricket coaches